Representation of the People Act is a stock short title used in Antigua and Barbuda, The Bahamas, Bangladesh, Barbados, Belize, Ghana, Grenada, Guyana, India, Jamaica, Mauritius, Pakistan,  Saint Vincent and the Grenadines, Trinidad and Tobago, the United Kingdom and Vanuatu for legislation dealing with the electoral system. Representation of the People Acts is a collective title for legislation relating to representation of the people, including Rating Acts and other Registration Acts. The title was first used in the United Kingdom in the 1832 Great Reform Act and was adopted in other countries of, or formerly part of, the British Empire thorugh the spread of the Westminster parliamentary system.

Antigua and Barbuda
 The Representation of the People Act 1975 (No 19)

Bahamas
 The Representation of the People Act, 1969 (No 40)
 The Representation of the People Amendment Act, 1975 (No 25)
 The Representation of the People (Amendment) Act, 1977 (No 3)
 The Representation of the People Amendment Act, 1981 (No 6)
 The Representation of the People Amendment Act, 1982 (No 1)

Bangladesh
 The Representation of the People Order, 1972
 The Representation of the People Amendment Act, 1981 (XVI)

Barbados
An Act of Barbados passed on 6 June 1840 had the title "An Act to amend the representation of the people of this Island, and to declare who shall be liable to serve on Juries". An Act supplemental to this Act was passed on 30 December 1842.
 The Representation of the People Act, 1891 (No 54) (c 64)
 The Representation of the People (Amendment) Act, 1896 (Act 36)
 The Representation of the People (Amendment) Act, 1897 (Act 6)
 The Representation of the People (Amendment) Act, 1898 (No 13) also called the Representation of the People Act, 1898
 The Representation of the People Act, 1901 (No 2)
 The Representation of the People Act (1951) (No 40)
 The Representation of the People (Amendment) Act, 1953
 The Representation of the People Act, 1955 (No 46)
 The Representation of the People (Amendment) Act, 1956 (No 52)
 The Representation of the People Act, 1957 (No 50)
 The Representation of the People Act, 1971 (No 15)

Belize
 The Representation of the People Ordinance, 1953 (No 13)
 The Representation of the People (Amendment) Ordinance, 1953 (No 25)
 The Representation of the People (Amendment) Ordinance, 1960 (No 8)
 The Representation of the People (Amendment) Ordinance, 1968 (No 8)
 The Representation of the People Ordinance 1978
 The Representation of the People Act 1980

Ghana
 The Representation of the People (Women Members) Act, 1959 (No 72)
 The Representation of the People (Women Members) Act, 1960 (No 8)
 The Representation of the People Decree, 1968 (NLCD 255)
 The Representation of the People (Amendment) Decree, 1968 (NLCD 270)
 The Representation of the People (Amendment) Decree, 1969 (NLCD 350)
 The Representation of the People (Amendment) (No. 2) Decree, 1969 (NLCD 363)
 The Representation of the People (Amendment) Decree, 1979 (SMCD 230)
 The Representation of the People Law, 1992 (PNDCL 284)
 The Representation of the People (Amendment) Law, 1992 (PNDCL 296)

Grenada
 The Representation of the People Act 1993 (No 35) (Cap 286A)

Guyana
 The Representation of the People Ordinance, 1953 (No 5)
 The Representation of the People Ordinance, 1957 (No 3)
 The Representation of the People (Amendment) Ordinance, 1961
 The Representation of the People Act (1964) (Cap 1.03)
 The Representation of the People (Adaptation and Modification of Laws) Act 1968 (No 16)

India
 The Representation of the People Act, 1951 (No 43)
 The Representation of the People (Amendment) Act, 1956 (No 2)
 The Representation of the People (Amendment) Act 1963 (No 2)
 The Representation of the People (Amendment) Act 1966 (No 47)
 The Representation of the People (Amendment) Act, 1975
 The Representation of the People (Amendment) Act, 1992
 The Representation of the People (Amendment) Ordinance 1955 (No 7)
 The Jammu and Kashmir Representation of the People Act, 1957 (Act 4)
 The Jammu and Kashmir Representation of the People (Amendment) Ordinance, 1961 (No 1)
 The Jammu and Kashmir Representation of the People (Amendment) Act, 1982 (No 1)

Jamaica
 The Representation of the People Law, 1944 (Cap 342) (Law 44)
 The Representation of the People (Amendment) Law, 1950 (Law 10)
 The Representation of the People (Amendment) Law, 1955 (Law 44)
 The Representation of the People (Amendment) Law, 1958 (No 44)
 The Representation of the People (Amendment) Act 1963 (No 54)
 The Representation of the People (Special Provisions) (Amendment) Act 1965
 The Representation of the People (Amendment) Act 1966
 The Representation of the People (Official Lists) (Special Provisions) Act 1972 (No 10)
 The Representation of the People (Interim Electoral Reform) Act 1979 (No 20)
 The Representation of the People (Validity of Official List of Electors) Act 1982
 The Representation of the People (Official Lists) (Special Provisions) Act 1983 (No 11)
 The Representation of the People (Interim Electoral Reform) (Amendment) Act 1984
 The Representation of the People (Interim Electoral Reform) (Amendment) Act 1990
 The Representation of the People (Interim Electoral Reform) Amendment Act 1995

Mauritius 
 The Representation of the People Act 1958, also called the Representation of the People Ordinance, 1958 (No 14)
 The Representation of the People (Amendment) Ordinance (1960) (No 7)
 The Representation of the People (Amendment) Ordinance (1961) (No 70)
 The Representation of the People (Amendment) Ordinance 1965 (No 40)
 The Representation of the People (Amendment) Act (1968) (No 12)

Pakistan
 The Representation of the People Act, 1957 (No XXXI)
 The Representation of the People Act 1976
 The Representation of the People (Amendment) Act, 1977 (No XVI)
 The Representation of the People (Amendment) Ordinance, 1980 (Ordinance XVII)

Saint Vincent and the Grenadines
 The Representation of the People Act, 1982 (No 7)
 The Representation of the People (Amendment) Act, 1984 (No 8)
 The Representation of the People (Amendment) Act, 1992 (No 10)
 The Representation of the People (Amendment) Act, 1998 (No 1)

Trinidad and Tobago
 The Representation of the People Ordinance, 1961 (No 33)
 The Representation of the People (Amendment) Act, 1966
 The Representation of the People Act 1967 (No 41) (Cap 2:01)
 The Representation of the People (Amendment) Act 2000

United Kingdom 
The expression "Act to amend the Representation of the People" appears in the title of the Act that was subsequently given the short title "the Representation of the People Act 1832", and that Act was referred to by that expression in 1832. Some Representation of the People Acts are considered to be Reform Acts. Although it has no special status or priority in law, the 1918 Act, dealing with universal voting and other matters of political representation, could be viewed as part of a body of statute law making up the Constitution of the United Kingdom. The title was adopted in other countries of, or formerly part of, the British Empire through the spread of the Westminster parliamentary system.
 The Representation of the People Act 1832
 The Representation of the People (Scotland) Act 1832
 The Representation of the People (Ireland) Act 1832
 The Representation of the People (Scotland) Act 1835
 The Representation of the People (Ireland) Act 1850
 The Representation of the People (Ireland) Act 1861
 The Representation of the People Act 1867
 The Representation of the People (Scotland) Act 1868
 The Representation of the People (Ireland) Act 1868
 The Representation of the People Act 1884
 The Representation of the People Act 1918
 The Representation of the People (Amendment) Act 1918
 The Representation of the People (Returning Officers' Expenses) Act 1919
 The Representation of the People Act 1920
 The Representation of the People (No. 2) Act 1920
 The Representation of the People Act 1921
 The Representation of the People Act 1922
 The Representation of the People (No. 2) Act 1922
 The Representation of the People (Economy Provisions) Act 1926 — an alternative citation for Part III of the Economy (Miscellaneous Provisions) Act 1926
 The Representation of the People (Equal Franchise) Act 1928
 The Representation of the People (Reading University) Act 1928
 The Representation of the People Act 1945
 The Representation of the People Act 1948
 The Representation of the People Act 1949
 The Representation of the People (Amendment) Act 1957
 The Representation of the People (Amendment) Act 1958
 The Representation of the People Act 1969
 The Representation of the People Act 1974
 The Representation of the People (No. 2) Act 1974
 The Representation of the People (Armed Forces) Act 1976
 The Representation of the People Act 1977
 The Representation of the People Act 1978
 The Representation of the People Act 1979
 The Representation of the People Act 1980
 The Representation of the People Act 1981
 The Representation of the People Act 1983
 The Representation of the People Act 1985
 The Representation of the People Act 1989
 The Representation of the People Act 1990
 The Representation of the People Act 1991
 The Representation of the People Act 1993
 The Representation of the People Act 2000

Vanuatu
 The Representation of the People Act 1982 (No 13) (Cap 146)

See also
 Elections in the United Kingdom § History
 Electoral reform
 List of short titles
 Suffrage
 Universal suffrage

Notes

References

Further reading 
 Pilkington, Colin. "Representation of the People Act(s)". The Politics Today Companion To the British Constitution. Manchester University Press. 1999. Pages 133 and 134.
 Briggs, Asa The Age of Improvement 1783-1867 (1959)
 Woodward, Llewellan. The Age of Reform, 1815–1870 (2nd ed. 1961)
 

Lists of legislation by short title